The 41st FIE Fencing World Cup began in October 2011 and concluded in August 2012 at the 2012 Summer Olympics held in London.

Individual Épée

Individual Foil

Individual Sabre

Team Épée

Team Foil

Team Sabre

References 

Fencing World Cup
2011 in fencing
2012 in fencing
International fencing competitions hosted by the United Kingdom
2012 in British sport